Aníbal Nazoa (1928–2001) was a Venezuelan writer and journalist.

Published works
 1969: Aquí hace calor (It's hot here)
 1969: Obras incompletas (Works incomplete)
 1973: Las artes y los oficios (The arts and crafts)
 1981: La palabra de hoy (The word for today)

1928 births
2001 deaths
Venezuelan male writers
Venezuelan journalists
People from Caracas
20th-century journalists